Doluš is an uninhabited settlement in Croatia, located in the municipality of Brod Moravice, Primorje-Gorski Kotar County.

References

Ghost towns in Croatia